The Lamborghini Super Trofeo is an international motor racing series. The Lamborghini Super Trofeo is the one-make championship organized by Lamborghini Squadra Corse. The series involves exclusively Huracán Super Trofeo Evo model cars in 3 continental series: Europe, Asia, and North America.  The three continental series all have a common format: 6 double races, each 50 minutes long, on the world’s most prestigious circuits, completed by a World Final that decrees the Lamborghini world champions.

Lamborghini Super Trofeo drivers compete in identical Lamborghini Huracán Super Trofeo Evo cars, based on the Lamborghini Huracán LP 620-2 replacing the older Gallardo version. The drivers are also divided according to categories – Pro, Pro-Am, Am, and LB Cup.

Championships

International
 Lamborghini Super Trofeo World Final (2013– )

Regional
 Lamborghini Super Trofeo Europe (2009– )
 Lamborghini Super Trofeo Asia (2012– )
 Lamborghini Super Trofeo North America (2013– )
 Lamborghini Super Trofeo Middle East (2017–2019)

Champions

Super Trofeo Europe

Drivers

Teams

Super Trofeo North America

Drivers

Teams

Super Trofeo Asia

Super Trofeo World Final

Young Drivers Program

2020:

See also
Ferrari Challenge
Porsche Supercup
Trofeo Maserati

References

External links